WITCH (standing for "Weak Interaction Trap for Charged particles"), or experiment IS433, is a double Penning trap experiment to measure the recoil energy of decaying nuclei. A spectrometer in combination with a position-sensitive microchannel plate detector is used to count ions (with the MCP) while scanning their energy (using the spectrometer). The experiment is located at the ISOLDE Radioactive Ion Beam Facility in CERN. The beam from ISOLDE is bunched by REXTRAP after which it is transferred to the WITCH set-up.

Working principle 

The ion bunch from REXTRAP is slowed in a pulsed drift cavity in the vertical beamline. After this the bunch is injected into the  magnetic field. Here the ion cloud is trapped in the first Penning trap (for cooling). Its purpose is to cool down the ions with buffer gas. In this trap, it is possible to apply different excitation modes (dipolar, quadrupolar and octopolar). The ions are then transferred to the second Penning trap (in which decays are studied).

When an ion decays, it can escape the decay trap into the spectrometer. The spectrometer consists out of a set of electrodes to create an electrical potential barrier. If the decayed ion's energy is high enough, it will be able to overcome this barrier to be detected at the top of the setup.

Physics goal 

The first goal of the experiment is to measure the so-called beta-neutrino correlation. This is indirectly done by measuring the shape of the spectrum of the recoiling ions. This beta-neutrino correlation can provide, if measured precisely, information about fundamental weak interaction properties. According to the Standard Model the weak interaction has a Vector–Axial vector structure. But there are other mathematical possibilities which have not been detected in nature yet. The WITCH experiment will search for scalar currents in the first place. But it is also possible to look for tensor currents.

Other physics goals are the search for heavy neutrinos, measuring Fermi/Gamov-Teller mixing ratios, measuring electron capture probabilities, etc.

References 
 WITCH Homepage

External Links 
WITCH experiment record on INSPIRE-HEP

Particle experiments
CERN experiments